Shagadam Stadium (Turkmen: «Şagadam» stadiony; Russian: Стадион «Шагадам»)  is a stadium in Turkmenbashi, Turkmenistan. It is currently used mostly for Ýokary Liga football matches and serves as the home for Şagadam Türkmenbaşy. The stadium originally had natural grass and capacity for 1,500 peoples.

History 
The stadium hosted soccer 2006 Turkmenistan Cup and 2021 Turkmenistan Cup finals.

References

Football venues in Turkmenistan